Thekkada  is a village in Thiruvananthapuram district in the state of Kerala, India.

Demographics
 India census, Thekkada had a population of 13198 with 6340 males and 6858 females.

References

Villages in Thiruvananthapuram district